Levi Withee (October 26, 1834February 2, 1910) was an American lumberman, businessman, and Wisconsin pioneer.  He served eight years in the Wisconsin State Senate, representing La Crosse County.

Biography
Withee was born on October 26, 1834, in Somerset County, Maine.  He was raised on his father's farm and received a common school education. Upon reaching adulthood, he was tempted by the opportunities in the new western states and moved to Wisconsin.  He arrived in La Crosse, Wisconsin, in 1853 and went to work in the lumber industry.  By 1859, he had enough earnings to begin his own business further north, in Clark County, Wisconsin.

He was an owner or shareholder in many lumber companies in western Wisconsin, but was principally involved in the company Bright & Withee.  He was also invested in the Electric Light Plant, the Gas Light Company, and the La Crosse Farming Company.

Withee was elected to the Wisconsin State Senate on the Republican ticket in 1892 and was re-elected in 1896, serving from 1893 to 1901.  He did not run for a third term in 1900, but was a delegate that year to the 1900 Republican National Convention.  He was a stalwart Republican, always opposed to Robert La Follette's Progressive Republicans, and endorsed a primary challenge against La Follete in his 1902 gubernatorial re-election campaign.

Withee died from a stroke in 1910.

Personal life and family
Levi Withee was a son of Zachariah Withee and his wife Polly ( Longley).  Zachariah Withee was a veteran of the War of 1812 and received land as a reward for his service.  Levi Withee was the fifth of seven children.  His older brother Niram Withee also worked as a lumberman in the La Crosse area and was a member of the Wisconsin Legislature.

On June 3, 1868, he married Louisa H. Smith. They had one son, Abner, who was also active in the lumber business in Wisconsin and Florida, and was appointed to the Bureau of Internal Revenue in Florida.

Electoral history

| colspan="6" style="text-align:center;background-color: #e9e9e9;"| General Election, November 8, 1892

| colspan="6" style="text-align:center;background-color: #e9e9e9;"| General Election, November 3, 1896

References

External links
 

 

Businesspeople from Wisconsin
Businesspeople in timber
People from Somerset County, Maine
Politicians from La Crosse, Wisconsin
Republican Party Wisconsin state senators
1834 births
1910 deaths
19th-century American politicians
19th-century American businesspeople